"Farewell Party" is a song written by Lawton Williams. Lawton also had the original recording in 1960. Little Jimmy Dickens recorded the song in 1961. It was also recorded by American country music artists Johnny Bush and Waylon Jennings, as well as Gene Watson.  Watson's cover was released in February 1979 as the second single from the album Reflections.  The song reached #5 on the Billboard Hot Country Singles & Tracks chart.

Cover versions

 Alan Jackson on his 1999 album Under the Influence
 Joe Nichols on his 2004 album Revelation
 Heidi Hauge on her 2004 album Country Jewels

Charts

Weekly charts

Year-end charts

References

1979 singles
1979 songs
Gene Watson songs
Alan Jackson songs
Joe Nichols songs
Capitol Records singles
Songs written by Lawton Williams